Sadra, is a planned city in Central District, Shiraz County, Fars Province, Iran.

Sadra's studies and design began in 1989 and eventually, the comprehensive plan of the city was approved by the "Supreme Council of Urban Planning and Architecture of Iran" in February 1995. Sadra was upgraded to a city in 2009 due to population growth and development.

Many academic campuses are located in Sadra, including Shiraz University of Medical Sciences, Islamic Azad University, Shiraz Branch, and Shiraz University of Technology. Sadra also is a medical hub and home to Abu Ali Sina organ transplant hospital, Amir ol-momenin burn hospital, Sadra psychiatric hospital, Sadra oncology hospital, and Khatam ol-anbia heart hospital.

References

Populated places in Shiraz County
Cities in Fars Province